Gloria is the anglicized form of the Latin feminine given name , meaning immortal glory; glory, fame, renown, praise, honor.

Notable people with the name include:

People

Academics and scientists
 Gloria Long Anderson (born 1938), American professor of chemistry
 Gloria Begué Cantón (1931–2016), Spanish professor, jurist, senator and magistrate
 Gloria Conyers Hewitt (born 1935), American mathematician
 Gloria Ladson-Billings (born 1947), American educator
 Gloria Montenegro, Chilean botanist and biologist
 Glòria Muñoz (born 1949), Spanish professor and painter
 Gloria Townsend, American computer scientist

Actors
 Gloria DeHaven (1925–2016), American actor and singer
 Gloria Diaz (born 1951), Filipina actor and winner of Miss Universe 1969
 Gloria Grahame (1923–1981), American actor and singer
 Gloria Hendry (born 1949), African-American actor
 Gloria Henry (1923–2021), American actor
 Gloria Jean (1926–2018), American actor and singer
 Gloria Joy (1910–1970), American actor
 Gloria Manon (1939–2018), American actor
 Gloria Paul (born 1940), Anglo-Italian actor and dancer
 Gloria Reuben (born 1964), Canadian actor and singer
 Gloria Romero (actress) (born 1933), Filipino-American actor
 Gloria Saunders (1927–1980), American actor
 Gloria Stuart (1910–2010), American actor
 Gloria Swanson (1899–1983), American actor

Musicians
 Gloria Shayne Baker (1923–2008), American composer and songwriter
 Gloria Coates (born 1938), American composer
 Gloria Estefan (born 1957), Cuban-American singer-songwriter
 Gloria Gaynor (born 1943), American singer
 Gloria Jessica (born 1994), Indonesian singer-songwriter
 Gloria Lynne (1929–2013), American jazz singer
 Gloria Mann, American singer
 Gloria Trevi (born 1968), Mexican singer-songwriter

Politicians
 Gloria Macapagal Arroyo (born 1947), 14th President of the Philippines
 Gloria María Borrero (born 1956), Colombian justice minister
 Gloria De Piero (born 1972), former British Member of Parliament
 Gloria McPhee (1926–2007), Bermudian politician
 Gloria Amon Nikoi (1927–2010), Ghanaian foreign minister
 Gloria Romero (politician) (born 1955), American politician
 Gloria Vaughn (1936–2020), American politician

Sports
 Gloria Emanuelle Widjaja, Indonesian badminton player
 Gloria Gauchia, Spanish table tennis player
 Gloria Hooper (athlete), Italian sprinter
 Gloria Marconi, Italian long-distance runner
 Gloria Pizzichini, Italian tennis player

Writers
 Gloria Feldt, American writer
 Gloria D. Miklowitz, author of young adult literature
 Gloria Naylor, American novelist

Other people
 Gloria Allred, American attorney and women's rights activist
 Gloria Blackwell, African-American civil rights activist and educator
 Gloria Camiruaga (1941–2006), Chilean video artist
 Gloria de Herrera, American art restorer and collector
 Gloria Guinness, Mexican socialite and fashion icon
 Gloria Hunniford, British TV and radio presenter
 Gloria Ramirez (1963–1994), woman who died from complications related to cancer and known as "The Toxic Lady".
 Gloria Steinem, American feminist icon and writer
 Gloria Morgan Vanderbilt, American socialite
 Gloria Vanderbilt, American socialite
 Gloria, Princess of Thurn and Taxis

Fictional characters
 Gloria, a character from the 1993 American comedy-drama film Mrs. Doubtfire
 Gloria Baker, in the cartoon M.A.S.K.
 Gloria Bardwell, on the CBS soap opera The Young and the Restless
 Gloria Gilbert, The Beautiful and Damned
 Gloria Glad, aka Gloria Pazinski, in the Richie Rich comics and movie and season 5 of Harvey Street Kids
 Gloria Mundy, the main character from the 1978 American romantic comedy thriller film Foul Play
 Gloria Pollard, on the soap opera Emmerdale
 Gloria Price, on the soap opera Coronation Street
 Gloria Pritchett, from Modern Family (2009–2020)
 Gloria Stivic, on the 1970s sitcom All in the Family
 Gloria (Madagascar), a hippopotamus from the film Madagascar
 Gloria (The Simpsons), a recurring character in the animated sitcom The Simpsons
 Gloria, protagonist of Pokémon Sword and Shield
 Gloria, a Disney character from the Donald Duck universe who is Fethry Duck's girlfriend
 Gloria, in Happy Feet

See also
 Gloria (disambiguation)
 Glória (disambiguation)
 Glory (disambiguation)
 La Gloria (disambiguation)

References

External link

English feminine given names
Italian feminine given names
Spanish feminine given names